Juan Antonio María Flores y Jijón de Vivanco (23 October 1833 – 30 August 1915) as 13th  President of Ecuador 17 August 1888 to 30 June 1892.
He was a member of the Progressive Party, a Liberal Catholic party.

Antonio Flores was born in Quito at Carondelet Palace (the presidential residence) while his father, General Juan José Flores, presided over the nation.  His mother was Mercedes Jijón de Vivanco y Chiriboga, daughter of the Count of Casa Jijón, member of one of Quito's old aristocratic families. 

During the first presidency of Gabriel García Moreno, Flores was an ambassador in Paris, London, and Washington. He was also Minister of Finance in 1865. He died in Geneva, Switzerland.  He was married to Leonor Ruiz de Apodaca y García-Tienza, a native of Cuba.  His vice president and predecessor was Pedro José Cevallos.

References

 ANTONIO FLORES JIJON. diccionariobiograficoecuador.com

1833 births
1915 deaths
People from Quito
Presidents of Ecuador
Ecuadorian Ministers of Finance
Ambassadors of Ecuador to France
Ambassadors of Ecuador to the United Kingdom
Ambassadors of Ecuador to the United States